Alexander Duncan McEachern (born September 27, 1939) is a former provincial level politician from Alberta, Canada. He served as a member of the Legislative Assembly of Alberta from 1986 to 1993.

Political career
McEachern ran for political office for the first time in the 1975 Alberta general election. He ran in the electoral district of Edmonton-Glenora as a candidate for the New Democrats but was badly defeated by incumbent cabinet minister Lou Hyndman.

He made a second attempt to run for office in the 1979 general election in the Edmonton-Kingsway electoral district. This time he finished second to incumbent Progressive Conservative MLA Kenneth Paproski. He attempted a third run for office in the 1982 Alberta general election with another second-place finish slightly improving his vote total to Progressive Conservative candidate Carl Paproski.

McEachern won his fourth attempt for public office, defeating three other candidates in the 1986 Alberta general election. He was re-elected for a second and final term in the 1989 Alberta general election. His majority was reduced. but he still defeated the other two candidates with a comfortable margin. Edmonton-Kingsway was abolished due to redistribution in 1993. McEachern ran in the new electoral district of Edmonton-Mayfield for the 1993 Alberta general election. He was defeated by Liberal candidate Lance White.

McEachern is still active with the Alberta New Democrats. serving as the President of the Lesser Slave Lake electoral district.

References

External links
Legislative Assembly of Alberta Members Listing

Alberta New Democratic Party MLAs
Living people
1939 births